The Lock Artist is a standalone crime novel by American novelist Steve Hamilton. It was first published in 2010 by Minotaur Books. The story centers on a young man with a talent for lock picking.

The Lock Artist has won several awards, including the 2011 Edgar Award for Best Novel and the 2011 Alex Award from the Young Adult Library Services Association, commending the book's appeal to young adult readers.

In 2012 Shane Salerno acquired the film rights.

Awards and honors
The New York Times named The Lock Artist  a Notable Crime Book of 2010. 

In 2013, it was named the Best Translated Mystery of the Year in Japan (2013 Kono Mystery ga Sugoi!).

References

2010 American novels
Crime novels
Edgar Award-winning works
Minotaur Books books